is a Japanese-American country music fiddler and singer who currently performs at his theater, the Shoji Tabuchi Theatre, in Branson, Missouri.

Early life
Shoji Tabuchi was born April 16, 1944 in Daishōji, Ishikawa, Japan (now Kaga, Ishikawa, Japan). When Tabuchi turned 7, he went to his elementary school where they had show and tell and one of his classmates played the violin using the Suzuki method. He went back home to tell his mother that he wanted to play violin using this method.

Career
In the mid-1960s, Tabuchi was a sophomore in his college and had heard that Roy Acuff was coming to Osaka, Japan. Tabuchi went to his concert and got to meet Acuff backstage. Acuff's music inspired Tabuchi to pursue country and bluegrass music.

When Tabuchi was in college, he formed a band called The Bluegrass Ramblers, which led them to win a national contest in Japan. He decided to travel to the United States with his violin and only $500. After living in San Francisco, Kansas City, and Louisiana, Tabuchi moved to Nashville to reconnect with Acuff, who arranged an appearance for Tabuchi to perform at the Grand Ole Opry. Tabuchi later made numerous appearances on the Grand Ole Opry.

The Shoji Tabuchi Show
Tabuchi arrived in Branson around 1980. After performing successfully for a few years he built one of Branson's most elaborate theaters, which was completed in 1990, and began hosting his own show. Besides country music, The Shoji Tabuchi Show has incorporated polka, gospel, Cajun, Hawaiian, rap, and rock music.

Tabuchi has developed a loyal fan base through his Branson show. He employs about 200 personnel at his elaborate 2,000-seat theater, where he performs two shows daily most of the year.

The theater was closed due to a backstage fire in May 2017. It reopened the following year, on October 22, 2018.

The Shoji Tabuchi Show garnered considerable attention when it was featured on the RedLetterMedia web series Best of the Worst. The VHS release of the show's third volume first appeared on the inaugural "Wheel of the Worst" (episode #5) on April 30, 2013, and was finally viewed on the fourth "Wheel of the Worst" (episode #16), which premiered on "RedLetterMedia's " website on February 28, 2014. It was voted "Best of the Worst", meaning it was the most entertaining video of the night. The group likened his stage presence to that of a Martin Short character.

Personal life
Mary Jo, a patron at a financial-district restaurant where Tabuchi played for tips, became his first wife in 1968, after which he became an American citizen. They moved to Kansas City, and Tabuchi began performing at the Starlite Club in nearby Riverside, Missouri. In 1974 the couple had a son, Shoji John Tabuchi.

After moving to Branson in 1980, he met his second wife, Dorothy Lingo, after she attended several of his shows at the Starlite Theater; and he became the stepfather to her two children from a previous marriage. Lingo helps with numerous production aspects of The Shoji Tabuchi Show such as choreography, costume design, and the theater's interior design. Tabuchi is sometimes accompanied by his stepdaughter, Christina.

Selected discography
 Country Music My Way (ABC/Dot, 1975)
 After Dark, Shoji Entertainments
 Songs for Mark Koeper, Shoji Entertainments
 Different Moods: Collection One, Shoji Entertainments
 Fiddlin' Around, Shoji Entertainments
 Live from Branson, Shoji Entertainments
 Notes from Shoji, Shoji Entertainments
 The Shoji Tabuchi Show! Vols. 1–4, Shoji Entertainments
 Songs for the Lord, Shoji Entertainments

References

External links
 Shoji's site

 "Tabuchi, Shoji." Contemporary Musicians. 2006. Encyclopedia.com. 12 Jun. 2014.

1944 births
Living people
20th-century American musicians
20th-century Japanese musicians
21st-century American musicians
21st-century Japanese musicians
American country fiddlers
American musicians of Japanese descent
Japanese emigrants to the United States
Japanese country fiddlers
People from Branson, Missouri
Musicians from Ishikawa Prefecture
Country musicians from Missouri